Fit to Be Tied may refer to:
Fit to Be Tied (album), a Joan Jett and the Blackhearts albums
Fit to Be Tied (film), a 1952 Tom and Jerry short
"Fit to Be Tied", a song by Quiet Riot from their self-titled album